Alles Atze (English: Everything Atze) is a German comedy television series which aired on RTL between 2000 and 2007. The series revolves around the fictional character Atze Schröder.

Synopsis 
Atze Schröder is a kiosk owner in Essen-Kray. He has a Turkish employee, named Murat. Schröder lives with his blond girlfriend Sabine, called "Biene", in an apartment behind the kiosk. Among his best friends and most loyal customers are bodybuilder Harry and police officer Viktor. His landlord Richard Plattmann, also called "Opa Pläte", appears regularly in the series.

Common themes in the series are betting, gender-specific differences, and Atze Schröder's drive for profit. One of the hallmarks of the series, above all, is that almost all of the characters speak "Ruhrdeutsch".

See also
List of German television series

References

External links
 

German comedy television series
2000 German television series debuts
2007 German television series endings
Television shows set in North Rhine-Westphalia
RTL (German TV channel) original programming
German-language television shows